Iridotriton is an extinct genus of prehistoric salamander known from a fossil found in stratigraphic zone 6 of the late Jurassic Morrison Formation in the Dinosaur National Monument. One species has been described, Iridotriton hechti. It is likely a member of Cryptobranchoidea.

See also

 Prehistoric amphibian
 List of prehistoric amphibians
 Paleobiota of the Morrison Formation

References

Jurassic salamanders
Morrison fauna
Jurassic amphibians of North America
Late Jurassic animals of North America
Prehistoric amphibian genera
Cryptobranchoidea